Methydrion may refer to:

 Methydrio, a town in Arcadia, Greece
 Methydrium, a town of ancient Arcadia, Greece
 Methydrion (Thessaly), a city of ancient Thessaly, Greece